Jane Vaughn (married: Sullivan) (1921 - March 25, 2016) was an American figure skater. She won the United States Figure Skating Championships in 1940 and 1941.

She was inducted into the U.S. Figure Skating Hall Of Fame in 1996. She was the older sister of Arthur Vaughn Jr.

Results

References

   

American female single skaters
Place of birth missing
1921 births
2016 deaths
21st-century American women